Darryl is an English name, a variant spelling of Darell.

Male variations of this name include: Darlin, Daryl, Darrell, Darryl, Daryll, Darryll, Darrell, Darrel. 

Female and unisex variations of this name include: Daryl, Darian, Dareen, Darelle, Darlleen, Darrelle, and Darryl.

People

Darryl
 Darryl Brown (West Indian cricketer) (born 1973)
 Darryl Brown (South African cricketer) (born 1983)
 Darryl Byrd (born 1960), American former football player
 Darryl Cunningham (born 1960), English cartoonist (see also Daryl Cunningham below)
 Darryl David (born 1971), a member of the Singapore Parliament
 Darryl Dawkins (1957–2015), American National Basketball Association player
 Darryl Drake (1956–2019), American football coach and player
 Darryl George (born 1993), Australian baseball player
 Darryl Hamilton (1964–2015), American Major League Baseball player
 Darryl Hardy (born 1968), American former National Football League player
 Darryl Henley (born 1966), American former National Football League player convicted of drug trafficking and attempted murder
 Darryl Hickman (born 1931), American actor and television executive
 Darryl Hill, multiple people
 D. L. Hughley (born 1963),  American actor, political commentator, radio host, author and stand-up comedian
 Darryl Johnson (disambiguation), multiple people
 Darryl Jones (disambiguation), multiple people
 Darryl Kile (1968–2002), American Major League Baseball pitcher
 Darryl Kurylo (born 1965), American voice actor
 Darryl Lewis (born 1961), American football player (see also Darryll Lewis below)
 Darryl McDaniels (born 1964), American musician, a founding member of the hip hop group Run–D.M.C.
 Darryl Monroe (born 1986), basketball player in the Israeli Basketball Premier League
 Darryl Morris (American football) (born 1990), American National Football League player
 Darryl Pinckney (born 1953), American novelist, playwright and essayist
 Darryl Sittler (born 1950), Canadian former National Hockey League player
 Darryl Stingley (1951–2007), American National Football League player who suffered a career-ending spinal cord injury
 Darryl Strawberry (born 1962), American former Major League Baseball outfielder
 Darryl Sutter (born 1958), Canadian former National Hockey League player and head coach
 Darryl Tapp (born 1984), American National Football League player
 Darryl Wren (born 1967), American former football player
 Darryl F. Zanuck (1902–1979), American film producer and studio executive

Daryl
 Daryl (magician) (1955–2017), American magician Daryl Easton
 Daryl Beattie (born 1970), Australian former Grand Prix motorcycle road racer
 Daryl Braithwaite (born 1949), Australian singer
 Daryl Cunningham (born 1960), former Australian rules footballer
 Daryl Dragon (1942–2019), American musician and songwriter, co-founder of the music duo Captain & Tennille
 Daryl Hall (born 1946), American singer, musician, songwriter and producer, co-founder of the music duo Hall & Oates
 Daryl Hannah (born 1960), American actress and environmental activist
 Daryl Janmaat (born 1989), Dutch footballer
 Daryl Johnston (born 1966), American National Football League commentator and former player
 Daryl Katz (born 1961), Canadian billionaire businessman and philanthropist
 Daryl Lindsay (1889–1976), Australian artist
 Daryl Mack (1958–2006), American convicted murderer
 Daryl Mitchell, multiple people
 Daryl Morey (born 1972), American sports executive
 Daryl Murphy (born 1983), Irish footballer
 Daryl Ong (born 1987), Filipino singer
 Daryl Sabara (born 1992), American actor
 Daryl Somers (born 1951), Australian entertainer

Daryll
 Daryll Clark (born 1986), football quarterback
 Daryll Cullinan (born 1967), former South African cricketer
 Daryll Hill (born 1982), American former basketball player
 Daryll Jones (born 1962), American former National Football League player
 Daryll Reddington (born 1972), New Zealand cricketer

Darryll
 Darryll Holland (born 1972), English jockey
 Darryll Lewis (born 1968), American former National Football League player

Fictional characters
 Darryl, a Brawler in Brawl Stars
 Darryl Braxton, on the Australian soap opera Home and Away
 Daryl Coopersmith, a character in the 1987 American teen movie Adventures in Babysitting
 Daryl Dixon, on the American television series The Walking Dead
Darryl MacPherson, a character from the comic strip and 2000–2002 TV series Baby Blues
 Darryl Jenks, a character in the 1988 American romantic comedy film Coming to America
 Darryl McGee, a character in The Ghost and Molly McGee
 Darryl Morris (Charmed), on the American television series Charmed
 Darryl Morton, on the British soap opera Coronation Street
 Darryl Philbin, on the American television series The Office
 Daryl Tanaka, a character in the 1994 American coming-of-age comedy-drama movie My Girl 2
 Darryl, two brothers on the American television series Newhart
 Sheriff Daryl Blubs, a character in Gravity Falls
 Bigfoot's selfprofessed actual name in a Progressive Insurance TV commercial
Character in the movie, D.A.R.Y.L.

Other
 D.A.R.Y.L., a 1985 science fiction film
 Daryl, a controversial 2009 comedy skit by Dan Harmon

See also
 Darla (disambiguation)

English unisex given names
English-language unisex given names